Actinocarya is a small genus of annual herbs in the family Boraginaceae. Species in the genus are found in Pakistan, China, and India.

Taxonomy 
The genus is known in China as 锚刺果属 (mao ci guo shu). There are two species in the genus:

 Actinocarya acaulis (W.W.Sm.) I.M.Johnst.
 Actinocarya tibetica C.B.Clarke

Description 
The species are annual herbs. They have slender and diffuse stems which sparsely short strigose or subglabrous. Their leaves alternate and are ovate-oblong to spatulate. They have thin pedicels and solitary, axillary flowers. Their calyx is 5-parted, slightly enlarged in fruit, and spreading. Their corolla is rotate-campanulate and the stamens are inserted into its tube; they have five throat appendages and fives lobes of limb spreading. Their ovaries are 4-parted, style are not exserted, and stigmas are subcapitate. They have four nutlets which are narrowly ovoid with glochids.

References 

Boraginoideae
Boraginaceae genera